A candareen (Singapore English usage: hoon) is a traditional measurement of weight in East Asia. It is approximately 378 milligrams.

In Hong Kong, one candareen is 0.3779936375 grams and, in the Weights and Measures Ordinance, it is  ounces avoirdupois. In Singapore, one candareen is 0.377994 grams.

The word candareen comes from the Malay kandūri. An earlier English form of the name was condrin. The Mandarin Chinese word fēn is used to denote  of a Chinese renminbi yuan but the term candareen for that currency is now obsolete.

Postal denomination

On 1 May 1878 the Imperial Maritime Customs was opened to the public and China's first postage stamps, the "Large Dragons", were issued to handle payment. The stamps were inscribed "CHINA" in both Latin and Chinese characters, and denominated in candareens.

References

See also 
 Postage stamps and postal history of China#Imperial China
 Chinese units of measurement
 Economy of China
 Economic history of China (Pre-1911)
 Economic history of China (1912–1949) 

 
 

Chinese units in Hong Kong
Currencies of Asia
Currencies of China
Modern obsolete currencies
Units of mass